are a Japanese football (soccer) club based in Aoba-ku, Yokohama. They play in Division 1 of Kantō Soccer League.

History

Kantō Soccer League team
Having been established in 2013, the Toin University Football Club rose quickly through the Kanagawa Prefecture leagues, gaining successive promotions from the Third, Second and then First Divisions in 2014, 2015 and 2016 respectfully.

They are currently managed by former player Hiroshi Sekita.

University team
Established in 1998, the representative team of the Toin University of Yokohama compete in the Kantō University Soccer League and the Emperor's Cup.

They are currently managed by former player Toru Yasutake.

Structure
The club consists of 2 top teams. One play in the university competitions, and the other participate in the semi-professional Kantō Soccer League. All the players are students of the university.

The two teams played against each other in the 2020 Emperor's Cup.

Semi-professional team

Current squad

Season to season

Honors
Kanagawa Prefecture Third Division
Champions (1): 2014

Kanagawa Prefecture Second Division
Runners up (1): 2015

Kanagawa Prefecture First Division
Champions (1): 2016

Kantō League D2
Champions (2): 2018, 2020

University team

Current squad

Season to season

Honors
Kantō University Soccer League Second Division
Runners up (1): 2012

Kantō University Soccer League First Division
Runners up (1): 2019

Amino Cup
Champions (1): 2016

Kanagawa Soccer Championship
Champions (4): 2013, 2015, 2019, 2020
Runners up (2): 2002, 2017

References

External links
 Official Website 

Football clubs in Japan
Association football clubs established in 2013
University and college association football clubs
Sports teams in Kanagawa Prefecture
1998 establishments in Japan
2013 establishments in Japan